A Time of Changes is a 1971 science fiction novel by American writer Robert Silverberg. It won the Nebula Award for that year, and was also nominated for the 1972 Hugo and Locus Awards.

Plot introduction 
The novel is set in a culture where the first person singular is forbidden, and words such as I or me are treated as obscenities or social errors. A powerful new drug enables protagonist Kinnall Darival to attain telepathic contact with others, and this sharing brings him the courage to lead a revolution against his repressive culture.

The novel is presented in the style of an autobiography, written by Kinnall while he awaits impending capture and imprisonment for his cultural crimes.

The theme of I being a forbidden word is shared with Ayn Rand's 1938 novella "Anthem". However, Silverberg stated that he did not know of Rand's book until after his own was published, and that his aim in depicting such a society was completely different from hers.

Plot summary 
Life in Velada Borthan is ruled by the Covenant, of which the most conspicuous trait is the denial of the self. Referring to oneself in the first person is forbidden. A selfbarer is someone who exposes his soul to others and as a result is ostracized.

The protagonist of the story is Kinnall Darival, a prince of the province of Salla, tormented by existential doubts and by his forbidden passion for his bondsister, Halum. (Bond siblings are an important institution of this society; though not biologically related, the incest taboo among them is as strong as among actual siblings). After his brother Stirron becomes Prime Septarch of Salla, Kinnall exiles himself to the neighboring province of Glin to avoid a direct clash with him. Following a more than cold reception in Glin, his monetary savings are sequestered by the Grand Treasurer of Salla, and he is declared an illegal alien, leaving him as a penniless fugitive. He finds a nice man who employs him for a year in a logging camp, but he is eventually recognized as the fugitive prince by a woman from Salla. On the road again, Kinnall takes shelter in Klaek, a miserable village in Glin, with a family of peasants. Longing for news from the "real world", Kinnall goes to Biumar and is engaged as a seaman on a merchant boat headed to the province of Manneran. Once there, he turns to his bondfather, Segvord, for a job which allows him an honest living in Manneran.

While becoming a powerful bureaucrat in Manneran, Kinnall marries Halum's look-alike and cousin Loimel - however, it turns out to be a loveless and unhappy relationship, as Loimel looks like Halum but has a different personality, and she could sense she is being used as a surrogate for somebody else.

Kinnall then meets the Earthman Schweiz with whom he begins to freely discuss his alienation from his own culture. Schweiz tells him about the wonderful drug available in the wild southern country of Sumara Borthan. Finally, both go to a country lodge and share the secret drug, causing their minds to become open to one another and creating a strong connection between them. Kinnall and Schweiz organize a small expedition to Sumara Borthan where they share the drug with the natives in a kind of social magic ritual.

Smuggling a large amount of the drug into Manneran, Kinnall starts to be the apostle of a new selfbaring cult, convincing many people to share the telepathic drug with him. Among them is his bondbrother Noim. Finally, betrayed and revealed, he seeks escape to Noim's estate in Salla. There he is visited by his beloved Halum, and they share the drug. She is so disturbed by the experience that she enters the pen of the voracious stormshields, who shred her to pieces. 
This is taken as evidence of drug being dangerous, and of Kinnall being a criminal for spreading it. Kinnall takes his last flight to the Burnt Lowlands where he ultimately is captured by the royal guards.

The book ends ambiguously. One possibility is that though Kinnal himself was executed or imprisoned for life, what he started developed into a widespread movement or cult, of which the book itself is in effect the Scriptures or basic document, and which eventually succeeded in overthrowing the established order. The other possibility is that all this was nothing more than a hallucination which Kinnal experienced under the influence of his drug, and that what he started ended with him. Both possibilities are left open—which evidently was Silverberg's deliberate intention.

Characters, places and concepts

Characters
Kinnall Darival - A prince of Salla, second son of the septarch. Tall and muscularly sportive.
Stirron - Older brother of Kinnall. A hulk like his brother. Eventually becomes septarch of the province of Salla.
The septarch - Father of Stirron and Kinnall. A man of slender body and modest height. Killed by a hornfowl - a large bird of prey - which caused Stirron to become the new septarch.
Noim Condorit - Kinnall's bondbrother. Son of Luinn Condorit from the northern frontier of Salla.
Halum Helalam - Kinnall's bondsister and his forbidden love interest. Daughter of Segvord Helalam from Manneran.
Schweiz - An earthman. A merchant who develops a strong relationship with Kinnall.

Concepts
Bonding - A personal alliance between individuals arranged by the families since early childhood. These bond-kin are intended to become very close friends.
Drainers - Throughout the story, Kinnall seeks relief in the drainers - much like Catholic confessors. The drainers are supposed to keep these revelations secret; however, at least one eventually uses the information he learns for political revenge.

Places
Planet Borthan - An Earth colony orbiting around a golden-green sun. There are five continents: Velada Borthan, Sumara Borthan, Umbis, Dabis and Tibis.
Burnt Lowlands - Arid place in the middle of Velada Borthan, flanked by two immense mountain ranges: the Huishtors in the east and the Threishtors in the west.
Velada Borthan - "The Northern World". Most important continent and home of the first-world human civilization. Divided into eastern and western portions by the Burnt Lowlands. Western portion is divided into nine unnamed provinces. The eastern portion has four provinces: Salla, Glin, Manneran and Krell.
Sumara Borthan - "The Southern World". In the early days of the planet's settlement, those who defied the Covenant were exiled to this southern continent, covered largely by a tropical jungle. Their society has devolved to a more or less primitive state, based around the ritual use of the selfbaring drug. Though not explicitly stated, the name may in some ways be derived from Sumatra.
Salla - A province of Velada Borthan. The capital, Salla City, is the home of Kinnall and Stirron.
Glain - Capital of the Glin province. Ugly, miserable, dismal. The folk of Glain are described as having dark clothes, dark frowns, dark souls, closed and shrunken hearts.
Biumar - Glin's main seaport and second most populous city. A greasy gray sprawl of an oversized town, backed up against a gray and menacing ocean.
Manneran Province - Province favored by the gods. The air is mild and sweet, filled all the year through with the fragrance of flowers.
Manneran - Prosperous, hot and beautiful capital city of Manneran Province. Its site is the finest natural harbor in all Velada Borthan. Manneran has established itself as the holy of the holies with the famous Stone Chapel, and a powerful center of commerce.

References

External links
 A Time of Changes at Worlds Without End
 

1971 American novels
1971 science fiction novels
American science fiction novels
Doubleday (publisher) books
Nebula Award for Best Novel-winning works
Novels by Robert Silverberg